David Raitt (7 December 1894–1969) was a Scottish footballer who played in the Football League for Blackburn Rovers and Everton.

References

1894 births
1969 deaths
Scottish footballers
Association football defenders
English Football League players
Dundee F.C. players
Everton F.C. players
Blackburn Rovers F.C. players
Forfar Athletic F.C. players